Hardheads is a common name for several organisms and may refer to:

Animals
Aythya australis, a species of duck
Micropogonias undulatus, a species of fish

Plants
Acroptilon repens
Centaurea nigra

Animal common name disambiguation pages